Season nine of Dancing with the Stars premiered on September 21, 2009, on the ABC network.

Some changes were added this season, including a larger cast and relay dances. Four new dances were introduced to complement the large cast: the bolero, lambada, two-step, and Charleston.

Singer Donny Osmond and Kym Johnson were crowned the winners, while singer Mýa and Dmitry Chaplin finished in second place, and reality star Kelly Osbourne and Louis van Amstel finished in third place.

Cast

Couples
The cast was unveiled on the August 17, 2009, edition of Good Morning America. Executive producer Conrad Green confirmed to Entertainment Tonight that the season would start off with 16 celebrities, with 3 double-eliminations halfway through the season. Former U.S. House Majority Leader Tom DeLay withdrew from the competition in week three; however, Debi Mazar was also eliminated on the same night, replacing the double elimination planned for week five. Pro pairings were officially announced on August 24, 2009.

Host and judges
Tom Bergeron and Samantha Harris returned as the show's co-hosts. Len Goodman, Bruno Tonioli, and Carrie Ann Inaba returned as the judges, with Baz Luhrmann appearing as a guest judge in week two. This was Samantha Harris' last season as co-host.

Scoring charts

Notes

 : This was the lowest score of the week.
 : This was the highest score of the week.
 :  This couple finished in first place.
 :  This couple finished in second place.
 :  This couple finished in third place.
 :  This couple withdrew from the competition.
 :  This couple was in the bottom two or three, but was not eliminated.
 :  This couple was eliminated.

Highest and lowest scoring performances 
The highest and lowest performances in each dance according to the judges' 30-point scale are as follows.

Couples' highest and lowest scoring dances
Scores are based upon a potential 30-point maximum.

Weekly scores
Individual judges scores in charts below (given in parentheses) are listed in this order from left to right: Carrie Ann Inaba, Len Goodman, Bruno Tonioli.

Week 1
The couples had to prepare two dances (either the cha-cha-cha or foxtrot, and the salsa or Viennese waltz) dividing themselves between men and women. The men performed on the first night and the women on the second night. On the first night, the men performed either the cha-cha-cha or foxtrot, and then participated in either a salsa or Viennese waltz relay. The judges ranked the couples in each relay. On the second night, the women performed either the salsa or Viennese waltz, and then participated in either a cha-cha-cha or foxtrot relay. One couple was eliminated at the end of each night. Couples are listed in the order they performed.

Tom DeLay was reported as having a possible stress fracture in his foot on September 15, just one week before the competition. However, the injury did not keep him out of the competition. Additionally, Mýa had to go to the hospital for stitches on September 20 after a glass shattered in her hand. This injury did not affect her performance. After the show, Debi Mazar was taken to the hospital with a torn muscle in her neck and chest.

Night 1 (Men)

Night 2 (Women)

Week 2
Each couple performed either the jive, quickstep, or tango. Couples are listed in the order they performed.

During rehearsal on September 28, Lacey Schwimmer "severely strained" her hip flexors and abductors. Her injuries required three weeks of physical therapy, though she continued to dance on the show during her treatments.

Week 3
Each couple performed either the rumba or samba. Couples are listed in the order they performed.

Tom Bergeron announced that the slight fracture that had plagued Tom DeLay earlier had become a full fracture, and DeLay later reported that he had stress fractures in both feet, and could not continue the competition. On the results episode, DeLay formally announced that he would not continue as a contestant. Despite his withdrawal, Debi Mazar was still eliminated, because she had the lowest number of votes.

Week 4
Each couple performed either the bolero, Charleston, lambada, or two-step. Couples are listed in the order they performed.

Week 5
Each couple performed either the Argentine tango or paso doble, plus a group hustle. Couples are listed in the order they performed.

Maksim Chmerkovskiy performed with Joanna Krupa, because Derek Hough was out with the flu. Additionally, Kelly Osbourne was taken to the hospital with a foot injury sustained during her routine.

Week 6
Each couple performed either the jitterbug or waltz, as well as a mambo relay. After the lowest-scoring couple was eliminated, the other two couples in the bottom three competed against each other in a dance-off to determine which would also be eliminated. Couples are listed in the order they performed.

Week 7
Each couple performed one unlearned dance, and either a team paso doble or team tango. After the lowest-scoring couple was eliminated, the other two couples in the bottom three competed against each other in a dance-off to determine which would also be eliminated. Couples are listed in the order they performed.

Anna Trebunskaya performed with Mark Dacascos, because Lacey Schwimmer was also sidelined by illness.

Week 8
Each couple performed two unlearned dances, the second of which had to reflect the style of a particular era. Couples are listed in the order they performed.

Week 9
Each couple performed three dances. Couples are listed in the order they performed.

Week 10
Each couple performed three routines, including one megamix (featuring the Viennese waltz, samba, and jive), and a freestyle. Couples are listed in the order they performed.
Night 1

Night 2

Dance chart
The celebrities and professional partners danced one of these routines for each corresponding week.
 Week 1 (Night 1, Men): One unlearned dance (cha-cha-cha or foxtrot) and one relay dance (salsa or Viennese waltz)
 Week 1 (Night 2, Women): One unlearned dance (salsa or Viennese waltz) and one relay dance (cha-cha-cha or foxtrot) 
 Week 2: One unlearned dance (jive, quickstep, or tango)
 Week 3: One unlearned dance (rumba or samba)
 Week 4: One unlearned dance (bolero, Charleston, lambada, or two-step)
 Week 5: One unlearned dance (Argentine tango or paso doble) & hustle group dance
 Week 6: One unlearned dance (jitterbug or waltz) & mambo marathon
 Week 7: One unlearned dance & team dances
 Week 8: Two unlearned dances
 Week 9: Two unlearned dances & redemption dance
 Week 10 (Night 1): One unlearned dance, megamix & freestyle
 Week 10 (Night 2): Favorite dance of the season

Notes

 :  This was the highest scoring dance of the week.
 :  This was the lowest scoring dance of the week.
 :  This couple danced, but received no scores.

References

External links

Dancing with the Stars (American TV series)
2009 American television seasons